The 2010 Canadian Championship (officially the Nutrilite Canadian Championship for sponsorship reasons) was a soccer tournament hosted and organized by the Canadian Soccer Association that took place in the cities of Montreal, Toronto and Vancouver in 2010. The tournament has been held annually since 2008.

As in previous tournaments, participating teams included the Montreal Impact, Toronto FC and Vancouver Whitecaps FC. The tournament consisted of home and away series between each pair of teams for a total of six games. Toronto FC won the tournament, claiming the Voyageurs Cup and Canada's entry into the Preliminary Round of the 2010–11 CONCACAF Champions League. 

All six matches were broadcast in English by Rogers Sportsnet.

Standings

Matches

Top goalscorers

References

External links
 2010-11 Champions League Qualifying at official CONCACAF website
 2010 Nutrilite Canadian Championship at official Canadian Soccer Association website

2010 domestic association football leagues
Championship
2010
2010–11 CONCACAF Champions League